Edson Rizzo (born 22 November 1957) is a Brazilian handball player. He competed in the men's tournament at the 1992 Summer Olympics.

References

External links
 

1957 births
Living people
Brazilian male handball players
Olympic handball players of Brazil
Handball players at the 1992 Summer Olympics
Handball players from São Paulo
Pan American Games bronze medalists for Brazil
Pan American Games medalists in handball
Medalists at the 1987 Pan American Games
20th-century Brazilian people